Clifford Abrams (April 26, 1935 – April 13, 2002) was a South African cricketer, who played for North Eastern Transvaal in first class cricket.

References

External links
player profile

1935 births
2002 deaths
South African cricketers
Northerns cricketers